Live at CBGB is an album of live recordings from New York hardcore band Agnostic Front. It was released in 1989 on Relativity Records and follows their third studio album, Liberty and Justice For..., from 1987. It is one of many available live albums by the band – their next was 1993's Last Warning and most recent Live at CBGB - 25 Years of Blood, Honor and Truth from 2006.

The line-up featured one change from the previous studio album – Craig Setari replacing Alan Peters on bass. Shortly after the album's release, Roger Miret was imprisoned and another album was not made until 1992 with One Voice.

Track listing

Personnel
Agnostic Front
 Roger Miret – vocals
 Vinnie Stigma – lead guitar
 Steve Martin – rhythm guitar
 Craig Setari – bass
 Will Shepler – drums
Production
 Recorded August 21, 1988 at CBGB, New York City
 Produced by Norman Dunn
 Engineered by Steve McAllister, Tommy Victor, and Gil Abarbanel
 Cover art by Andrea Elston

External links
Flex! Discography album entry
Discogs album entry
Agnostic Front official website

Agnostic Front albums
1989 live albums
Albums recorded at CBGB